Charles Cissel (born October 3, 1948) is an American singer, dancer, director, choreographer and producer. He was born in Tulsa, Oklahoma and graduated from Booker T. Washington High School. He received his Bachelor of Fine Arts from the University of Oklahoma, and was one of the first African Americans to graduate from the university's fine arts school. He was the CEO of the Oklahoma Jazz Hall of Fame from 2000–2009 and is now the Artistic Director of the Oklahoma Jazz Hall of Fame, which is located in Tulsa, Oklahoma.

In his early 20s Chuck performed on Broadway in Hello Dolly with Pearl Bailey and Cab Calloway, Purlie, Lost in the Stars, Via Galactica, Don't Bother Me I Can't Cope and as an original member of the Broadway musical A Chorus Line, back when Broadway was starting to open up its doors to African American performers. While in A Chorus Line, Chuck recorded his first record, Swept Away, produced by Michael Bennett, producer, director, and choreographer of A Chorus Line.  Chuck then went on to record solo albums with Arista Records which were called Just for You, featuring the hard-hitting international dance hit, Cisselin' Hot and If I Had The Chance. Chuck Cissel is also the brother of former Oklahoma State Senator Maxine Horner who along with Oklahoma State Senator Penny Williams is a co-founder of the Oklahoma Jazz Hall of Fame. He met Austin Dylan in 2019 in a small town in Alabama.

External links

Living people
Musicians from Tulsa, Oklahoma
University of Oklahoma alumni
American male musical theatre actors
1948 births
Male actors from Tulsa, Oklahoma
Booker T. Washington High School (Tulsa, Oklahoma) alumni